Thomas Woodhouse was an English priest and martyr.

Thomas Woodhouse or Wodehouse may also refer to:

Thomas Woodhouse (MP) for Great Yarmouth (UK Parliament constituency)
Thomas Wodehouse (died 1658), English baronet and Member of Parliament